Hans Naumann (May 13, 1886 – September 25, 1951) was a German literary historian (philologist) and folklorist (Germanist). Naumann was the first historian to describe the Ottonian period as a medieval renaissance.

Naumann was born in Görlitz and died in Bonn. Being a member of the Nazi Party, Naumann was a strong proponent of the book burning.



Literary works 
 Grundzüge der deutschen Volkskunde, 1922
 Deutsche Dichtung der Gegenwart, 1923
 Germanischer Schicksalsglaube, 1934

Footnotes

References

External links
 

1886 births
1951 deaths
People from Görlitz
People from the Province of Silesia
Nazi Party members
German philologists
Germanists
Germanic studies scholars
German folklorists
Ludwig Maximilian University of Munich alumni
University of Kiel alumni
Humboldt University of Berlin alumni
University of Strasbourg alumni
Academic staff of Goethe University Frankfurt
Academic staff of the University of Bonn
German male non-fiction writers
20th-century philologists